The Jefferson Scholarship is a full-ride merit scholarship established in the United States. Named for benefactor and Founding Father of the United States, Thomas Jefferson, the scholarship provides four years of fully-funded study at the University of Virginia. It is considered amongst the most prestigious scholarships worldwide.

In addition to covering all tuition, books, room and board, the scholarship also provides scholars finances for summer enrichment, independent research and study abroad. Application to the scholarship is by invite only, and around 30 scholars are selected annually from a direct pool of 6,000 nominating schools, each able to nominate one student. Scholars have included 22 Rhodes Scholars and Marshall Scholars, Pulitzer Prize winners and others.

History of the Scholarship 

The first Jefferson Scholarship was endowed in 1981, named for benefactor of the University of Virginia, and third President of the United States, Thomas Jefferson.  The program has grown since with the support of benefactors and endowments. As of 2017, the endowment size was $418.8m, supporting 139 scholars. The scholarship exceeds $333,000 for out-of-state scholars.

Selection criteria 
The mission of the Jefferson Scholars Foundation is to identify, attract, and nurture "individuals of extraordinary intellectual range and depth who possess the highest concomitant qualities of: Leadership, Scholarship, and Citizenship".

Scholars are nominated as the most accomplished student at their respective school, and then compete through a series of interview rounds from local to regional, national and the finals, which are held in Charlottesville, Virginia. There are currently 70 nominating regions, with over 6,000 schools eligible to nominate a student, and a pool of students exceeding 800,000. In 2020, over 2,100 high schools nominated students, and 34 selected, leaving the programme with a sub 2% admit rate from those nominated.

Enrichment programmes

Institute for Leadership & Citizenship 
The Leadership and Citizenship institute is a two week seminar for all Scholars, taking place at the end of their freshman year. It is held on the grounds of the University of Virginia, and consists of workshops, group discussions and personal exploration, and is designed to foster and develop the characteristics of leadership and citizenship in Scholars.

Travel Studies 
Following their sophomore year, Scholars are encouraged to partake in foreign travel and study, and invited to undertake a self-designed exploration into a topic of personal interest.

Many Scholars also take the opportunity to study at one of the university's partners for a semester.

Exploratory Fund 
The Exploratory Fund, as an initiative of the Foundation, provides seed funding for projects and concepts Scholars have. Developed as a means to support the innovation of Scholars, the Foundation encourages Scholars to build projects that serve societal and cultural development. New commercial or philanthropic enterprises within or outside the University can also apply for funding consideration.

See also 

 Morehead-Cain Scholarship
 Robertson Scholars Program

References 
11."Fully Funded Scholarships in USA for African 2023". www.uskill.com. February 10, 2023. Retrieved February 10, 2023.

 "Fully Funded Scholarships in USA for African 2023". Uskill. February 10, 2023. Retrieved February 10, 2023.

Scholarships in the United States
University of Virginia
Thomas Jefferson